Aerts is a Dutch patronymic surname, a reduced form of the personal name Arnout, that is particularly common in Belgium. Notable people with the surname include:

 Alan Aerts (born 1956), American powerlifting and bench press champion
 Conny Aerts (born 1966), Belgian astronomer
 Diederik Aerts (born 1974), Belgian theoretical physicist
 Egidius Aerts (1822–1853), Belgian flautist and composer
  (1892–1953), Belgian track cyclist
 Firmin Aerts (born 1929), Belgian politician
  (born 1958), Belgian composer
 Hendrick Aerts (c. 1570 – 1603), Flemish painter and draftsman
 Jean Aerts (1907–1992), Belgian road bicycle racer who specialized as a sprinter
 Jean-Marie Aerts (born 1951), Belgian guitarist and producer
 Kathleen Aerts (born 1978), Belgian singer in Flemish girl group K3
 Katrien Aerts (born 1976), Belgian freestyle skier
 Lode Aerts (born 1959), Belgian bishop of Bruges
 Maikel Aerts (born 1976), Dutch football goalkeeper
 Mario Aerts (born 1974), Belgian road bicycle racer
 Nelly Aerts (born 1962), Belgian long-distance runner
 Nelson Aerts (born 1963), Brazilian tennis player
 Peter Aerts (born 1970), Dutch kickboxer and martial artist
 Philippe Aerts (born 1964), Belgian jazz double bassist
 Remieg Aerts (born 1957), Dutch historian
 Sara Aerts (born 1984), Belgian heptathlete
 Thijs Aerts (born 1996), Belgian racing cyclist
 Toon Aerts (born 1993), Belgian racing cyclist

See also 
 Aerts, Dutch automobile manufactured in 1899
 Aarts, surname

References 

Dutch-language surnames
Patronymic surnames